Kabila may refer to:

Places
Kabila, Harju County, village in Kernu Parish, Harju County, Estonia
Kabila, Viljandi County, village in Suure-Jaani Parish, Viljandi County, Estonia
Tapong incl. Kabila, a village in Andaman & Nicobar Islands, India

People
Joseph Kabila (born 1971), former president of the Democratic Republic of the Congo (DRC)
Jaynet Kabila (born 1971), daughter of Laurent-Désiré Kabila
Laurent-Désiré Kabila (1939–2001), Joseph's father, the former president of the DRC
Zoé Kabila (born 1979), politician, daughter of Laurent-Désiré Kabila
Aimée Kabila Mulengela (1976–2008), alleged natural daughter of Laurent-Désiré Kabila
 Kabila (actor) - Bangladeshi actor